Etna is an unincorporated community in Clark County, Washington.

History

A post office called Etna was established in 1882, and remained in operation until 1918. The name is a transfer from Etna Green, Indiana.

References

Geography of Clark County, Washington